The Zoma Museum, formerly known as the Zoma Contemporary Art Center (ZCAC), is an environmentally conscious artist in residency project with locations in Addis Ababa and Harla, a historical village near Dire Dawa in Ethiopia. Due to its links and considerable work with European and American galleries, ZCAC has been influential in the contemporary Ethiopian visual art sector and as a conduit for Ethiopian artists to be featured internationally. It is currently headed by curator Meskerem Assegued.

History 
The concept was first introduced to the public in 2002 during Giziawi #1, its first art happening. Named after Zoma Shifferaw, a young Ethiopian artist who died of cancer in 1979, ZCAC is located in two major cities in Ethiopia. ZCAC Addis is in a house built by Elias Sime in Addis Ababa, and ZCAC Harla is in Harla, a small historic village east of Dire Dawa. ZCAC is run like a family where the surrounding community is an extension of the center.

Location

ZCAC Addis Ababa 

The construction of ZCAC begun in 2002 by Elias Sime, which took him about seven years to build the unique building of mud and straw. Due to Elias' solo exhibition "Eye of the Needle, Eye of the Heart" (2009) at the Santa Monica Museum of Art, the house attracted the attention of the world media. The New York Times Magazine called it "a voluptuous dream, a swirl of ancient technique and ecstatic imagination". The house is the home of ZCAC Addis and features a showroom and a studio for visiting artists. In 2014, the New York Times selected ZCAC's photo for their article about 52 places to go in 2014.

ZCAC Harla DireDawa 
Harla is a small village located in hills roughly 15 kilometers from Dire Dawa encompassing several archaeological sites. In 2007, ZCAC received a piece of land in Harla from the Dire Dawa city administration. Following ZCAC's goals, sustainable buildings are being constructed there.

Zoma School 
Zoma School is an edible schoolyard where students learn to create and sustain an organic garden in a landscape that is wholly integrated into the schools' curriculum, culture and food program. Inspired by Alice Waters Edible Schoolyard project, Zoma School aims to provide an education system where children are thought mathematics, science, language and art by integrated garden and kitchen classes.

References 

2002 establishments in Ethiopia
Arts organisations based in Ethiopia